Publius Petronius Turpilianus was a Roman senator who held a number of offices in the middle of the 1st century AD, most notably governor of Britain. He was an ordinary consul in the year 61 with Lucius Junius Caesennius Paetus as his colleague.

He was the (adopted?) son of Publius Petronius and Plautia, sister of Aulus Plautius who was the conqueror and first governor of Britain.

Life 
He was consul in 61, but in the second half of that year he laid down that office and was appointed governor of Roman Britain, replacing Gaius Suetonius Paulinus who had been removed from office in the wake of the rebellion of Boudica. In contrast to Suetonius's punitive measures, Petronius took a conciliatory approach, and conducted few military operations. In 63 he was replaced by Marcus Trebellius Maximus, and was appointed curator aquarum (superintendent of aqueducts) in Rome.

In 65 he was given a triumph, apparently for his loyalty to the emperor Nero. Following Nero's death in 68, Servius Sulpicius Galba, governor of Hispania Tarraconensis, was named Emperor by the Senate. During his march from Spain to Rome, Galba had Petronius summarily executed (or ordered him to take his own life) as a commander appointed by Nero.

References

Primary sources
Tacitus, Agricola 16; Annals 14:29, 14:39, 15:72; Histories 1:6, 1:37
Plutarch, Life of Galba 15
Frontinus, On the Water Supply of Rome 102

Secondary sources
William Smith (ed) (1870), Dictionary of Greek and Roman Biography and Mythology Vol 3 p. 1192
Kevin K Carroll (1979), "The Date of Boudicca's Revolt", Britannia 10, pp. 197-202
Anthony R Birley (1981), The Fasti of Roman Britain''

Footnotes 

68 deaths
1st-century Romans
Imperial Roman consuls
Roman governors of Britain
Roman consuls designate
Ancient Roman generals
Ancient Romans in Britain
People of the Year of the Four Emperors
Executed ancient Roman people
People executed by the Roman Empire
1st-century executions
Petronii
Year of birth unknown